Wakefield ( or ) is a settlement in the Tasman District of New Zealand's South Island, located about 25km south west of Nelson.

The settlement began in 1843 as Pitfure, but the name was changed to Wakefield a short time later. It may have been named after the birthplace of one of its original settlers, who was from Wakefield in Yorkshire. It may have also been named after Captain Arthur Wakefield, who led the expedition that first established Nelson City and Province. Arthur Wakefield was killed in the Wairau Affray, which may have helped confirm the change of name from Pitfure to Wakefield.

Wakefield comes under the responsibility of the Tasman District Council, which has its offices in the nearby town of Richmond. It is part of the West Coast-Tasman general electorate.

St John's Church in 120 Edward Street, built in 1846, is New Zealand's second oldest surviving church. It is registered by Heritage New Zealand as a Category I heritage structure, with registration number 40.

Demographics

Wakefield had a population of 2,448 at the 2018 New Zealand census, an increase of 147 people (6.4%) since the 2013 census, and an increase of 474 people (24.0%) since the 2006 census. There were 864 households. There were 1,224 males and 1,227 females, giving a sex ratio of 1.0 males per female. The median age was 41.5 years (compared with 37.4 years nationally), with 552 people (22.5%) aged under 15 years, 345 (14.1%) aged 15 to 29, 1,170 (47.8%) aged 30 to 64, and 384 (15.7%) aged 65 or older.

Ethnicities were 96.6% European/Pākehā, 7.6% Māori, 1.0% Pacific peoples, 1.0% Asian, and 1.7% other ethnicities (totals add to more than 100% since people could identify with multiple ethnicities).

The proportion of people born overseas was 16.5%, compared with 27.1% nationally.

Although some people objected to giving their religion, 60.7% had no religion, 28.9% were Christian, 0.1% were Hindu, 0.1% were Muslim, 0.1% were Buddhist and 2.3% had other religions.

Of those at least 15 years old, 270 (14.2%) people had a bachelor or higher degree, and 372 (19.6%) people had no formal qualifications. The median income was $32,500, compared with $31,800 nationally. The employment status of those at least 15 was that 978 (51.6%) people were employed full-time, 297 (15.7%) were part-time, and 45 (2.4%) were unemployed.

Wakefield Rural
Wakefield Rural is a statistical area that surrounds but does not include Wakefiled.

Wakefield Rural had a population of 1,248 at the 2018 New Zealand census, an increase of 75 people (6.4%) since the 2013 census, and an increase of 72 people (6.1%) since the 2006 census. There were 465 households. There were 654 males and 594 females, giving a sex ratio of 1.1 males per female. The median age was 47.2 years (compared with 37.4 years nationally), with 213 people (17.1%) aged under 15 years, 186 (14.9%) aged 15 to 29, 648 (51.9%) aged 30 to 64, and 198 (15.9%) aged 65 or older.

Ethnicities were 96.9% European/Pākehā, 6.2% Māori, 0.7% Pacific peoples, 1.2% Asian, and 1.9% other ethnicities (totals add to more than 100% since people could identify with multiple ethnicities).

The proportion of people born overseas was 14.7%, compared with 27.1% nationally.

Although some people objected to giving their religion, 58.9% had no religion, 29.3% were Christian, 0.2% were Hindu, 0.5% were Buddhist and 1.4% had other religions.

Of those at least 15 years old, 165 (15.9%) people had a bachelor or higher degree, and 192 (18.6%) people had no formal qualifications. The median income was $36,100, compared with $31,800 nationally. The employment status of those at least 15 was that 576 (55.7%) people were employed full-time, 198 (19.1%) were part-time, and 18 (1.7%) were unemployed.

Education

Wakefield is notable for Wakefield Primary School, the oldest school in continuous usage in New Zealand. It was set up in 1843 by Mary Ann Baigent, the wife of Edward Baigent.

References

Populated places in the Tasman District